Muhammad VII may refer to:

 Muhammed VII, Sultan of Granada (1370–1408)
 Muhammad VII al-Munsif (1881–1948)